Rhectogonia is a genus of moths belonging to the subfamily Olethreutinae of the family Tortricidae.

Species
Rhectogonia ancalota (Meyrick, 1907)
Rhectogonia dyschima Diakonoff, 1984
Rhectogonia electrosema Diakonoff, 1966
Rhectogonia sandrae Razowski, 2013

See also
List of Tortricidae genera

References

External links
Tortricid.net

Olethreutini
Tortricidae genera
Taxa named by Alexey Diakonoff